Randy Lewis (born 15 November 1978) is a Grenadian athlete competing in the triple jump. He represented Grenada at the 2004 and 2008 Summer Olympics, and has also competed at World Championship level indoors and outdoors. He won the bronze medal at the 2008 IAAF World Athletics Final. His personal best jump is 17.49 metres, achieved in May 2008 in São Paulo. This is the current Grenadian record.

Lewis attended Wichita State University where he is in the Hall of Fame for Track and Field. He won four individual titles in the Missouri Valley Conference and he is a three-time NCAA All-American. He also currently owns the triple jump records (indoor and outdoor) at Wichita State University.

He is coached by Gerd Osenberg, the former coach of Ulrike Meyfarth.

Achievements

References

1978 births
Living people
Grenadian triple jumpers
Athletes (track and field) at the 2004 Summer Olympics
Athletes (track and field) at the 2008 Summer Olympics
Olympic athletes of Grenada
Athletes (track and field) at the 2002 Commonwealth Games
Athletes (track and field) at the 2006 Commonwealth Games
Athletes (track and field) at the 2010 Commonwealth Games
Athletes (track and field) at the 2007 Pan American Games
Pan American Games competitors for Grenada
Commonwealth Games competitors for Grenada
Wichita State Shockers men's track and field athletes
Grenadian male athletes
World Athletics Championships athletes for Grenada
Central American and Caribbean Games medalists in athletics
Central American and Caribbean Games silver medalists for Grenada
Competitors at the 2010 Central American and Caribbean Games